The 2018 Salzburg state election was held on 22 April 2018 to elect the members of the Landtag of Salzburg.

The conservative Austrian People's Party (ÖVP) placed first, taking 37.8% of votes on a swing of almost nine percentage points, a decisive lead over the second-placed Social Democratic Party of Austria (SPÖ) which slipped four points, finishing on just over 20%. The Freedom Party of Austria (FPÖ) made small gains. The Greens were the main loser of the election; their voteshare fell by over half from 2013. NEOS – The New Austria (NEOS) contested their first state election in Salzburg, debuting at 7.3%. Team Stronach, which had won 8.3% in the previous election, did not compete.

The previous government coalition of the ÖVP, Greens, and Team Stronach now lacked a majority due to the absence of Team Stronach. After negotiations, NEOS agreed to join a coalition with the ÖVP and Greens, marking the first time NEOS had participated in a state government in Austria.

Background
After the 2013 election, the SPÖ government was replaced by a coalition of the ÖVP, Greens, and Team Stronach. In November 2015, Hans Mayr, the only member of the state government from Team Stronach, left the party, but continued to serve in government as an independent. In 2016 he founded his own party, the Salzburg Citizens' Community (SBG), with the intention of running in the 2018 state election.

In June 2015, conflicts arose between the federal FPÖ and the party's Salzburg branch, culminating in the expulsion of former regional chairmen Strache Schnell and Rupert Doppler from the party. They subsequently founded the Free Party Salzburg (FPS), which was joined by five of the FPÖ's six Landtag deputies. They sought to run in the 2018 election.

Electoral system
The 36 seats of the Landtag of Salzburg are elected via open list proportional representation in a two-step process. The seats are distributed between six multi-member constituencies. For parties to receive any representation in the Landtag, they must either win at least one seat in a constituency directly, or clear a 5 percent state-wide electoral threshold. Seats are distributed in constituencies according to the Hare quota, with any remaining seats allocated using the D'Hondt method at the state level, to ensure overall proportionality between a party's vote share and its share of seats.

Contesting parties
The table below lists parties represented in the previous Landtag.

Team Stronach, which contested the previous election and won 8.3% of votes and three seats did not contest the 2018 election.

In addition to the parties already represented in the Landtag, five parties collected enough signatures to be placed on the ballot:

 NEOS – The New Austria (NEOS)
 Free Party Salzburg (FPS)
 List Hans Mayr – Salzburg Citizens' Community (MAYR)
 KPÖ Plus (KPÖ) – on the ballot only in Salzburg City and Salzburg Surrounds
 Christian Party of Austria (CPÖ) – on the ballot only in Salzburg Surrounds

Opinion polling

Results

Results by constituency

Maps

Aftermath
On 23 April, Astrid Rössler announced her resignation as Greens leader, but remained in office on an interim basis and to participate in coalitions negotiations.

The ÖVP initiated exploratory talks with all parties in the Landtag. On 2 May, the state ÖVP executive voted to begin negotiate with the Greens and NEOS for a governing coalition. Haslauer described this arrangement as "a political alliance of the centre"; however, ÖVP federal Chancellor Sebastian Kurz advocated a coalition with the FPÖ.  On 25 May, coalition negotiations between the three parties were finalised, and the cabinet was presented. It was dubbed the "Dirndl coalition", after a traditional dress which is coloured similarly to the parties involved (black, green, and pink). The government was sworn in on 13 June.

Notes

References

Salzburg state government: Election information and Results

2018 elections in Austria
State elections in Austria
April 2018 events in Austria